Dušan Punoševac (born 28 July 1991) is a Serbian football defender, who plays for Trayal Kruševac.

Career
He started his career in Napredak Kruševac, but not debut for first team. After playing for Kopaonik Brus and Prva Petoletka Trstenik, he moved to OFK Beograd. He played on 5 Jelen SuperLiga matches for OFK Beograd. In 2014, he left to Sloga Petrovac na Mlavi.

References

External links
 
 Dušan Punoševac stats at utakmica.rs

1991 births
Living people
Sportspeople from Kruševac
Association football defenders
Serbian footballers
FK Napredak Kruševac players
OFK Beograd players
FK Donji Srem players
FK Sloga Petrovac na Mlavi players
Serbian SuperLiga players